Codex Cyprius, designated by K or 017 (in the Gregory-Aland numbering of New Testament Manuscripts), ε71 (in the von Soden numbering of New Testament manuscripts), or Codex Colbertinus 5149, is a Greek uncial manuscript of the four Gospels, written on parchment. It is one of the few uncial manuscripts with the complete text of the four Gospels, and it is one of the more important late uncial manuscripts. It was brought from Cyprus (hence the name of the codex) to Paris. 

The text of the manuscript was examined by many scholars. It is considered to mainly represent the Byzantine text-type (see Textual character below), but it has numerous peculiar readings. 

It has been variously dated (8th–11th centuries), but using the study of comparative writing styles (palaeography), it is currently dated to the 9th century.

Description 
The manuscript is a codex (precursor to the modern book), containing the complete text of the four Gospels written on 267 parchment leaves (sized ). The text itself is written in uncial letters of brown ink in one single column per page.  Each page contains 16 to 31 lines due to the handwriting being irregular and varying in size, with some pages having letters that are quite large. They are also upright, not round, and compressed. There is frequent insertion of an interpunction mark, and as it is sometimes in the wrong place for a stop, this has been supposed to occur in an ancient stichometrical style of writing, from which this manuscript may have been copied. A dot is always used to denote the end of the stichos. It includes rough and smooth breathing marks (utilised to designate vowel emphasis), with accents (used to indicate voiced pitch changes) likely from the original scribe, but these are often omitted or incorrectly placed. The breathings are indicated by ⊢ and ⊣, these signs were often used in the codices from the 9th and 10th century. Errors of itacism (confusion of similar sounding letters) are very frequent. It contains lectionary markings (employed to indicate which passage is to read on a certain day in the year) in the margin, the Synaxarion (a list of Saint's days) on pages 1–18, with a Menologion (a list of readings to be read each calendar month), and the Eusebian Canons tables (an early system of dividing the four Gospels into different sections) on pages 19–28.

The nomina sacra (special names/words considered sacred in Christianity - usually the first and last letters of the name/word in question are written, followed by an overline; sometimes other letters from within the word are used as well) are employed throughout. The last letter is dependent upon case; the nominative case abbreviations are as follows:  /  (man),  /  (David),  /  (God),  /  (Jesus),  /  (Jerusalem),  /  (Israel),  /  (Lord),  /  (mother),  /  (heaven),  /  (heavenly),  /  (father),  /  (spirit),  /  (spiritual),  /  (salvation),  /  (son),  /  (Christ/Messiah).

The text is divided according to the Ammonian Sections (Matthew has 359 sections, Mark 241, Luke 342, and John 232), whose numbers are given in the left margin of the text, and despite containing the Eusebian Canon tables at the beginning of the codex, references to the Eusebian Canons are absent. There was no other division according to the chapters (known as  / kephalaia) in the original codex, though it has their titles (known as  / titloi) at the top of the pages, and the chapter tables before each Gospel. It contains subscriptions after each of first three Gospels.

Colophon 
Near the end of the manuscript, on the reverse of page 267, there is a colophon (subscription) inserted by a second hand. According to this colophon the manuscript was written by a scribe named Basil, and it was bound by one Theodoulos, who commended themselves to the Virgin and St. Eutychios.  Some parts of the colophon are uncertain.

The Full text of the colophon is:

Text

Textual character 

The Greek text of this codex is considered a representative of the Byzantine text-type. The text-types are groups of different New Testament manuscripts which share specific or generally related readings, which then differ from each other group, and thus the conflicting readings can separate out the groups. These are then used to determine the original text as published; there are three main groups with names: Alexandrian, Western, and Byzantine. Together with Codex Petropolitanus (Π) it belongs to family Π, a group of manuscripts in close relationship to the text seen in Codex Alexandrinus (A). According to biblical scholar Samuel Prideaux Tregelles, it has many good and valuable readings, but according to biblical scholar Frederic Kenyon the text of the codex has no remarkable value, due to the manuscript being of a late date. According to biblical scholar Caspar René Gregory it has many old readings that preceded the Byzantine text-type. Textual critic Hermann von Soden classified it to the textual family I, and associated the provenance of this text with Jerusalem.

Textual critic Silva Lake considered the text of the codex as a somewhat diluted form of family Π, with a large number of peculiar readings, most of which are either misspellings or careless and ignorant mistakes. The readings it does not share with other Family Π representatives are supported outside the family, and they seem to be connected with the late Alexandrian group (C, L, M, N, Δ), but the number of Alexandrian readings is not high, and Silva Lake considered them as a result of accident as opposed to influence from a different text-type.

Textual critic Kurt Aland placed its text in Category V of his New Testament classification system. Category V manuscripts are described as having "a purely or predominantly Byzantine text." According to the Claremont Profile Method (a specific analysis method of textual data), its text belongs to the textual family Π in Luke 1, Luke 10, and Luke 20.

Some notable readings 
Below are some readings of the manuscript which agree or disagree with variant readings in other Greek manuscripts, or with varying ancient translations of the New Testament. See the main article Textual variants in the New Testament.

 (wine) – K  B D L Θ ƒ ƒ 33
 (vinegar) – A W 0250 Byz (see Psalm 69:22). According to textual critic Johann Jakob Wettstein, the reading οινον came from the Latin versions.

 (do not defraud)
omit – K B* W Ψ ƒ ƒ 28 700 1010 1079 1242 1546 2148 ℓ 10 ℓ 950 ℓ 1642 ℓ 1761 syr arm geo
incl. – B Majority of manuscripts

 (Naraios) – K*
 (of Nazareth) – K Majority of manuscripts

 (but He turned and rebuked them and He said: "You do not know what manner of spirit you are of; for the Son of man came not to destroy men's lives but to save them) – K Π 1079 1242 1546 ƒ (omit γαρ) Θ ƒ (omit υμεις and γαρ)
omit – Majority of manuscripts

 (an ass or an ox) – K  L X Π Ψ ƒ ƒ 33 892 1071, ℓ 547
 (a son or an ox) – Majority of manuscripts

 (their works are evil) – K (singular reading)
 (evil are their works)  – Majority of manuscripts

 (I am not going) – K  D 1241 f 
 (I am not yet going) – K B L T W Θ Ψ 0105 0180 0250 ƒ ƒ Majority of manuscripts

 (They heard this, and being convicted by their conscience, began to leave one by one) – K E G H 1079 1365

 (and seeing no one except the woman) – K K 
omit – D Γ 1 892 1010

 (Where are those accusers of yours?) – K (singular reading)
 (Where are your accusers?) – E F G S U ƒ 28 225 700 1009 1079
 (Where are they?) – D M Γ Tischendorfianus III ƒ

History

Discovery and further research 
The early history of the codex is unknown. It was brought from Cyprus to the Colbert Library (no. 5149) in Paris in 1673, whence it passed into its present locality in the National Library of France.

The manuscript was examined by biblical critic Richard Simon, who made some extracts for textual critic John Mill, who used readings from the codex in his edition of Novum Testamentum Graecum (an edition of the Greek New Testament). Wettstein employed readings from the codex, but with quite a large number of errors. Biblical scholar Johann M. A. Scholz valued it very highly, and he collated its text and noted its textual variants in 1820, but with so little care and numerous errors that his list is now ignored. Textual critic Constantin von Tischendorf produced a new collation in 1842, with Tregelles producing another independent collation in 1849, and in 1850 they compared their collations in Leipzig, and created a new list. Its textual variants are cited in Tischendorf's Editio Octava Critica maior (a critical edition of the Greek New Testament).
Historian Henri Omont and New Testament scholar William Hatch published some fragments of the codex in separate facsimile samples.

The manuscript was also examined and described by biblical scholar Bianchini, and Gregory, who saw the codex in 1883.

Wettstein believed the text of the codex was altered by influence from Old Latin manuscripts. Hatch stated the manuscript is "one of the more important of the later uncial manuscripts of the four Gospels".

Dating 
Richard Simon dated the manuscript to the 10th century. According to Montfaucon and Scholz, it was written in the 8th century. According to biblical scholar Leonard Hug it is not older than the ninth century, as several of the letter-forms in the manuscript have not been found in any other manuscript securely dated to before the 9th century CE.

Tischendorf and Gregory dated the manuscript to the 9th century. Tregelles dated the manuscript to the middle of the ninth century. Kenyon stated the manuscript must be not earlier than the 11th century, due to the formal liturgical hand and on palaeographic grounds. But Kenyon only saw Scrivener's facsimile, and his assessment was made only on the basis of this facsimile text.

Omont advised it is impossible to give a precise date to this manuscript on palaeographical grounds, as there are many manuscripts written in the same style of handwriting, but they are not dated. The 9th century is just as possible as well as the 11th century.

Silva Lake proclaimed it is difficult to prove it was written earlier than the year 1000, and it is perhaps as late as the middle of the eleventh century. This assessment was based rather on the textual dependency from other manuscript members of family Π, than on palaeographical grounds. According to Silva Lake, Minuscule 1219 represents a text of family Π in its earlier stage as opposed to Codex Cyprius. Cyprius could have been copied from Minuscule 1219, or from a copy of Minuscule 1219 (Silva Lake's hypothetical codex b). Minuscule 1219 can hardly have written before the year 980 or long after 990, and so as a result Codex Cyprius can hardly be dated long before the year 1000.

William Hatch argued the letters Β, Δ, Κ, Λ, Μ, Ξ, Π, Υ, Φ, Χ, Ψ, and Ω have forms which are characteristic of the late 10th or the early 11th century CE. Hatch also noted the handwriting of the codex bears a striking general resemblance to that of three Gospel lectionaries of the 10th and 11th centuries: ℓ 3, ℓ 296, and ℓ 1599. On the other hand, no such likeness exists between the codex and uncial manuscripts of the New Testament which were written in the 9th century. As such, Hatch argued the manuscript should be dated to about 1000.

Kenyon, Kurt Aland and biblical scholar Bruce Metzger dated it to the 9th century. The manuscript is currently dated by the Institute for New Testament Textual Research (INTF) to the 9th century.

The codex is currently located in the National Library of France (Gr. 63) in Paris.

See also 

 Biblical manuscript
 List of New Testament uncials
 Textual criticism

References

Further reading 
 Related articles

External links 

 
 Colour images of Codex Cyprius (digital) at the CSNTM.

Greek New Testament uncials
9th-century biblical manuscripts
Bibliothèque nationale de France collections